Laurynas Grigelis (born August 14, 1991) is a Lithuanian former professional tennis player and a prominent member of the Lithuania Davis Cup team. Grigelis holds the best ATP doubles ranking for Lithuanian player of all time.

Grigelis won his first title when he was 18 at a Futures tournament in Wrexham, United Kingdom. On ATP Challenger Tour Grigelis has won 13 titles, one singles and twelve doubles. He won his only singles title in summer 2011 in Aptos, United States. In 2012, Grigelis won five doubles titles. He captured three titles with Uladzimir Ignatik in Wofsburg, Germany, Cherbourg, and Saint Rémy, France, he achieved one title with Rameez Junaid in Saint–Brieuc, France, and one title with Alessandro Motti in Naples, Italy.

Since the end of 2010 Grigelis is coached by Giuseppe Menga.

Grigelis announced about his retirement from the professional tennis on 19 September 2021.

Challenger and Futures finals

Singles: 32 (23–9)

Doubles: 43 (29–14)

Singles performance timeline 

The table is current through season 2017.

Davis Cup 
Grigelis is a member of the Lithuania Davis Cup team, having posted a 6–9 record in singles and a 5–3 record in doubles in twelve ties played.

References

External links 

 
 
 
 Future Talent

Lithuanian male tennis players
Sportspeople from Klaipėda
1991 births
Living people